Romania competed at the 1928 Winter Olympics in St. Moritz, Switzerland.

Bobsleigh

References

 Olympic Winter Games 1928, full results by sports-reference.com

Nations at the 1928 Winter Olympics
1928
Olympics, Winter